Geran may refer to:
places
Gogaran, Armenia
Goran, Azerbaijan 
Bardarski Geran, Bulgaria
Geran, Iran (disambiguation), places in Iran

people
Elmer H. Geran, American politician
Gerry Geran, American ice hockey player
Juliana Geran Pilon, American political scientist

technology
Geran-1, Russian designation for Shahed 131 drone
Geran-2, Russian designation for Shahed 136 drone
GERAN, telecommunications standards

other
Geran (film), 2019 Malaysian Malay-language drama film
One of three characters from David Eddings' The Belgariad; see Garion